The Sri Lanka Police Long Service Medal is awarded to police officers in Sri Lanka of and below the rank of Chief Inspector in Sri Lanka Police for completing 18 years of unblemished service. The medal replaced the Ceylon Police Long Service Medal which was awarded until Ceylon became a Republic in 1972.

See also
 Awards and decorations of the Sri Lanka Police
 Ceylon Police Long Service Medal
 Police Long Service and Good Conduct Medal

References

External links
Sri Lanka Police

Civil awards and decorations of Sri Lanka
Law enforcement awards and honors
Awards established in 1972